Anectropis semifascia is a moth of the  family Geometridae. It is found in Taiwan.

References

Moths described in 1909
Ennominae
Moths of Taiwan